Sivalicus is a monotypic genus of Indian huntsman spiders containing the single species, Sivalicus viridis. It was first described by S. Dyal in 1957, and is found in India.

See also
 List of Sparassidae species

References

Monotypic Araneomorphae genera
Sparassidae
Spiders of the Indian subcontinent